The Fifth Circuit Court of the Supreme People's Court of People's Republic of China, opened at December 29, 2016 in Chongqing. It acts in the same authority as the Supreme People's Court and has jurisdiction in Chongqing, Sichuan, Guizhou, Yunnan and Xizang.

External links

References 

Organizations based in Chongqing
Supreme People's Court
2016 establishments in China
Courts and tribunals established in 2016